St Edward's Church may refer to:

 St Edward's Church, Hockley, Birmingham, England
 St Edward's Church, Kempley, Gloucestershire, England
 St. Edwards Church (Little Rock, Arkansas), United States
 St Edward's Church, Roath, Cardiff, Wales
 St Edward's Church, Sanday, Scotland
 St Edward's Church, Selly Park, Birmingham, England
 St Edward's Church, Stow-on-the-Wold, Gloucestershire, England
 St. Edward's Catholic Church, Shamokin, Pennsylvania, United States
 Church of St Edward the Confessor, Romford, Essex, England
 Church of St. Edward the Martyr, Brookwood, Surrey, England
 Church of St Edward King and Martyr, Goathurst, Somerset, England
 Church of St Edward, King of the West Saxons, a Grade II* listed building in Plymouth, England

See also
 St Edward's Church of England School, London, England